XETEJ-AM is a radio station in Tejupilco on 1250 kHz, owned by the government of the State of Mexico. It is part of the Radio Mexiquense state radio network.

XETEJ signed on May 18, 1983 along with XEGEM-AM 1600 serving Toluca, XETUL-AM 1080 in Tultitlán and XEATL-AM 1520 in Atlacomulco (now XHATL-FM 105.5).

References

Radio stations established in 1983
Radio stations in the State of Mexico
Public radio in Mexico